George Gorham may refer to:
George Congdon Gorham (1832–1909), American politician
George Cornelius Gorham (1787–1857), controversial English ecclesiastic
George Gorham Jr. (born 1987), American racing driver